Aspergillus tardus is a species of fungus in the genus Aspergillus. It is from the Cremei section. The species was first described in 1984.

References 

tardus
Fungi described in 1984